The following lists events in the year 2017 in Spain.

Incumbents
Monarch: Felipe VI
Prime Minister: Mariano Rajoy

Events

January
3 January - More than 1100 migrants fight with riot police on the border to the town of Ceuta.

February
17 February Iñaki Urdangarin (Brother-in-Law of Spain's King), found guilty of evading taxes
18 February – Protest «Volem acollir»

July
2017 Spain transportation strikes
 28 July – 2017 Barcelona train crash

August
 17 August – 2017 Barcelona attack

October
1 October – 2017 Catalan independence referendum
3 October – General strike in Catalonia against police violence in the referendum.
27 October – The Catalan Parliament declares the Independence of the Catalan Republic from Spain. The Spanish government imposes direct rule to Catalonia.

November
8 November – General strike in Catalonia against the Catalan imprisoned leaders.

December
21 December – Elections to the Catalan Parliament (21D).

Popular culture

Sports 
6 to 8 January – 2017 International Tournament of Spain (handball)
6 to 19 March – FIS Freestyle Ski and Snowboarding World Championships 2017 in Sierra Nevada
24 to 30 April – 2017 Barcelona Open Banco Sabadell (tennis)
19 August to 10 September – 2017 Vuelta a España (cycling)

Film 
4 February – 31st Goya Awards presented, to honour the best in Spanish films of 2016

Deaths

2 January – Moruca, footballer (b. 1932).
4 January – Jordi Pagans i Monsalvatje, painter (b. 1932).
15 January – Luis Gámir, politician (b. 1942).
23 January – Bimba Bosé, model, designer, actress and singer (b. 1975).
5 June – Juan Goytisolo, poet, essayist, and novelist (b. 1931)
5 July – Joaquín Navarro-Valls, Spanish-Vatican academic, journalist and physician (b. 1936)
3 September – Joan Colom, photographer (born 1921)
5 September – Eloísa Álvarez, politician, Mayor of Soria (1999–2003), Deputy (2004–2011) and Senator for Soria (2011–2015) (born 1956)
7 September – Tomás Villanueva, politician, Vice President of Castile and León region (2001–2003) (born 1953; heart attack)
8 September – José Antonio Souto, jurist, academic and politician, Mayor of Santiago de Compostela 1979–1981 (born 1938)
12 September – Xohana Torres, Galician language writer, poet, narrator and playwright (born 1931)
16 September – Bautista Álvarez, Galician nationalist politician (born 1933)
19 September – José Salcedo, film editor, Goya winner (1989, 1996, 2000) (born c.1949)
28 September – Antonio Isasi-Isasmendi, Spanish film director and producer  (born 1927)
4 October – Jesús Mosterín, anthropologist and philosopher of science (born 1941)

References

 
2010s in Spain
Years of the 21st century in Spain
Spain
Spain